David G. Berger (born October 27, 1946) is a former member of the Wisconsin State Assembly and Wisconsin State Senate.

Early life and education
Berger was born on October 27, 1946 in Milwaukee, Wisconsin. He is a graduate of the John Marshall High School, the University of Wisconsin–Madison.

Career
Berger was a member of the Senate from 1975 until 1983. Previously, he was elected to the Assembly in 1970. He is a Democrat.

References

Politicians from Milwaukee
Democratic Party Wisconsin state senators
University of Wisconsin–Madison alumni
Marquette University alumni
1946 births
Living people
Democratic Party members of the Wisconsin State Assembly